John Raymond McLaughlin (born November 13, 1975) is a former American football defensive end who played two seasons for the Tampa Bay Buccaneers in 1999 and 2000.

Early life
John Raymond McLaughlin was born on November 13, 1975 in Cleveland, Ohio. He attended William S. Hart High School in Santa Clarita, California. He went to college at Notre Dame before transferring to California.

NFL career

McLaughlin was drafted in 5th round with the 150th pick by the Tampa Bay Buccaneers. He mainly just played special teams in 1999 but he was one of their top performers on punts and kickoffs recording 13 tackles. He played in 12 games in the 1999 season. During the 2000 season, he had a knee infection that kept him from playing many games. He did have a blocked punt in 2000. In the 2000 season, he played 6 games. During the 2001 pre-season, he was released with an injury settlement. After the pre-season of 2001 he did not play another NFL game.

References

1975 births
Notre Dame Fighting Irish football players
Tampa Bay Buccaneers players
Players of American football from Ohio
American football defensive ends
California Golden Bears football players
Living people